Lianxi is a district in Jiujiang, Jiangxi, China. It was formerly named Lushan District, taking its name from Mount Lu, which was located inside its boundaries. In April 2016, jurisdiction for Mount Lu and Guling town was transferred to the newly renamed Lushan City (formerly Xingzi County), and Lushan District was renamed as Lianxi.

Administrative divisions
Lianxi District has 3 subdistricts, 5 towns and 2 township.
3 subdistricts
 Shili
 Wuli
 Qilihu

5 towns

2 township
 Yujiahe
 Gaolong

See also
Changjiu Intercity Railway 
Nanchang–Jiujiang Intercity Railway

References

Jiujiang
County-level divisions of Jiangxi